Uragami (written: 浦上) is a Japanese surname. Notable people with the surname include:

, Japanese musician, painter, poet and calligrapher
, Japanese samurai and commander 
, Japanese actor

Fictional characters 

 Uragami, a character in the manga series Parasyte

Japanese-language surnames